Kichise is a Japanese surname. Notable people with the surname include:

, Japanese footballer
, Japanese actress and model

Japanese-language surnames